The 2001 Louisiana–Monroe Indians football team represented the University of Louisiana at Monroe as a member of the Sun Belt Conference during the 2001 NCAA Division I-A football season. Led by third-year head coach Bobby Keasler, the Indians compiled an overall record of 2–9 with a mark 2–4 in conference play, placing in a three-way tie for fourth in the Sun Belt. Louisiana–Monroe's offense scored 148 points while the defense allowed 351 points. The team played home games at Malone Stadium in Monroe, Louisiana.

Schedule

References

Louisiana–Monroe
Louisiana–Monroe Warhawks football seasons
Louisiana–Monroe Indians football